Williston Middle High School is a public high school in Williston, Florida. It is a part of the School Board of Levy County, and serves students grades 6–12. Its school population currently is 1100 for the 2019–2020 school year. This school is currently the most populous high school in Levy County, Florida.

Its school mascot is the "Red Devils" and school colors are red and white.

Notable alumni
 Mike Payne,  Former professional baseball player (Atlanta Braves)
 Esix Snead, Former professional baseball player (New York Mets)
 Max White, Professional baseball player (Colorado Rockies)

References

External links 
 Williston Middle High School website
 School Board of Levy County website
Williston Middle High School JROTC

High schools in Levy County, Florida
Public high schools in Florida
Williston, Florida